Harry George Walter Drinkwater (1844–1895) was an English architect who practised in and around Oxford. His work included several churches and public houses.

Life
Drinkwater was born in Warwick on 17 March 1844, the son of George Drinkwater, a coachman, and his wife Eliza. At the time of the 1851 Census the family was still living in Warwick, but by 1860 they had moved to Oxford and George had become landlord of the George Inn, 33 Cornmarket Street.

In 1878 Drinkwater married Rose Carr at St Mark's parish church, Maida Vale, London. They made their home at 1 Farndon Road, North Oxford. Rose bore him two daughters and a son: Grace in 1879, George in 1880 and Ruth in 1883. George attended SS Philip and James Boys' School in Leckford Road, which Drinkwater designed and which was built in 1879.

Drinkwater became a Freemason, joining the Alfred Lodge (340). He was appointed Junior Deacon in 1881, Worshipful Master and Provincial Grand Senior Warden in 1885. He was also initiated into the Royal Arch Chapter and the Knights Templar, and was made a Worshipful Master of the Royal Mark Master Masons.

In 1895 Drinkwater fell ill and paid a visit to Wokingham, Berkshire, in the hope of improving his health. He died there on Sunday 13 October. His funeral was held in Oxford on Wednesday 16 October 1895, when he was buried in St Sepulchre's Cemetery, Oxford.

Drinkwater's widow Rose and their three children survived him. Their son George followed his father into architecture and also became a painter. Rose died in 1926 at her home at 67A St Giles', Oxford, and is buried with her husband in St Sepulchre's Cemetery. Their nephew John Drinkwater became a poet and playwright.

Career

Drinkwater was a pupil of William C. C. Bramwell in Oxford 1860–1865 and then assistant to the Gothic Revival architect G. E. Street 1865–1873. After a year as a travelling student and recipient of the Royal Academy travelling prize, Drinkwater began independent practice in Oxford and was made a Fellow of the Royal Institute of British Architects (FRIBA) in 1882. Drinkwater followed Street into designing and restoring Church of England churches and designing vicarages, but also undertook a number of commissions for Hanley's Morrell's and Weaving's breweries.

Drinkwater's brother Albert was involved in the New Theatre, Oxford. In 1885 Drinkwater bought shares in the Oxford Theatre Company. The New Theatre was demolished and in 1886 rebuilt to Drinkwater's designs. However, it was demolished and rebuilt again in 1933.

Work

St Frideswide's Vicarage, New Osney, Oxford (undated)
SS Philip and James Boys' School, Leckford Road, Oxford, 1879
Lion Brewery, Oxford, 1879–1901
St Margaret's parish church, Walton Manor, Oxford, 1883–93
St Augustine's parish church, Dudley, Worcestershire, 1884
St James' parish church, Aston, Oxfordshire: alterations, 1885–1889
New Theatre, Oxford, 1886 (demolished and replaced by new building in 1933)
SS Philip and James old vicarage, 68 Woodstock Road, Oxford, 1886–87 (now part of St Antony's College, Oxford)
St Andrew's parish church, Priestwood, Bracknell, Berkshire, 1888 (demolished c. 1989)
Hanley's Brewery, Oxford: square room and stores, 30 Pembroke Street, Oxford (now Modern Art Oxford)
St Leonard's parish church, Eynsham, Oxfordshire: restoration, 1892
WF Lucas's Clothing Factory, 59 George Street, Oxford, 1892
Cape of Good Hope public house, The Plain, Oxford, 1892
New Lodge, University Parks, Oxford, 1893
The Anchor public house, Polstead Road, Oxford, 1893
The Grapes public house, George Street, Oxford, 1894

References

Sources

External links 

 Harry Drinkwater photographs documenting Los Angeles art and Architecture, 1950-2004, Getty Research Institute, Los Angeles, Accession no. 2011.R.23. The collection of over 140 photographic prints and 1200 negatives represents a portion of photographer Harry Drinkwater's professional and personal output. African American architects, designers and artists and their works feature prominently in the collection.

1844 births
1895 deaths
19th-century English architects
Architects from Oxford
English ecclesiastical architects
Fellows of the Royal Institute of British Architects
Gothic Revival architects
People from Warwick